Sanjay Gupta is an Indian filmmaker, producer and screenwriter working primarily in Bollywood industry. Gupta is mostly known for his films such as Aatish, Kaante, Kaabil, Shootout at Lokhandwala, Shootout at Wadala, Jazbaa and Zinda. and Karam and Mumbai Saga and Shootout at Byculla. He has frequently cast Sanjay Dutt and John Abraham in his movies.

Film career
Gupta started his career with Aatish: Feel the Fire (1994) starring Aditya Pancholi and Sanjay Dutt. Later he went to write and direct films including Ram Shastra, Khauff and Jung. The filming of Jung (2000), lasted over two years. While filming Kaante in the Los Angeles in 2001, the events of the 9/11 attack forced the film to relocate planned scenes from several areas that were then considered sensitive. Commentators noted a similarity in Kaante to Quentin Tarantino's film Reservoir Dogs. Gupta said that he was inspired by a number of other films as well, including The Asphalt Jungle, The Killing, and the film that inspired Reservoir Dogs, Ringo Lam's City on Fire.

Gupta's Zinda (2006) has been described as an unofficial remake of the Korean film Oldboy.
	
He also produced the films Shootout at Lokhandwala (2007) and Dus Kahaniyaan, and directed and co-produced Shootout at Wadala, the sequel to Shootout at Lokhandwala.

On December 24, 2019, he made an announcement on the acquisition of Yali Dream Creations' Rakshak. Gupta took to Twitter to share the details about the project which revolves around a “vigilante” superhero. “So proud and happy to announce that my company White Feather Films has acquired the rights for ‘RAKSHAK’ A thrilling graphic novel about a vigilante superhero. This is India's first graphic novel to be made into a massive and ambitious feature film to be directed by me,” the director wrote alongside the covers of the four issues to the comics. He said he would be producing it under his company, White Feather Entertainment, along with co-producers, Asvin Srivatsangam and Vivek Rangachari from Yali Dream Works.

Filmography

References

External links
 

20th-century Indian film directors
Living people
Hindi-language film directors
Indian male screenwriters
Film directors from Mumbai
University of Mumbai alumni
Hindi film producers
21st-century Indian film directors
Film producers from Mumbai
1966 births

|}